Heinrich Fretwurst (born 25 April 1937) is a German former sports shooter. He competed in the 50 metre pistol event at the 1972 Summer Olympics for West Germany.

References

1937 births
Living people
German male sport shooters
Olympic shooters of West Germany
Shooters at the 1972 Summer Olympics
Sportspeople from Hamburg